Titanic Symphony, the third symphony composed by Richard Kastle, is based on the sinking of the . It is a four-movement piece for orchestra that begins with the ship leaving the dock on her maiden voyage. Its last movement describes the ship's sinking. Because Kastle felt the sea's rhythm was vital to the piece's creation, he composed it on Venice Beach, where he lived in the late 1980s.

Movements
 Her Maiden Voyage
 And the band played on...
 Ida's Love Theme
 The Sinking

Performances
The symphony was premiered on November 6, 1999 at Alice Tully Hall, Lincoln Center with Kastle conducting the orchestra. He recorded “Ida’s Love Theme” as a solo piece for piano on his Royce Concerto album in 1992, and performed the piano arrangement of the third movement on a national tour with comedian Jay Leno.

References

External links
 Titanic Symphony listening segments and liner notes

Kastle
1999 compositions
Works about RMS Titanic